Erebus albiangulata is a moth of the family Erebidae. It is found in Indonesia (Sumatra).

References

Moths described in 1924
Erebus (moth)